Labdia aresta is a moth in the family Cosmopterigidae. It is found in Australia, where it has been recorded from Queensland.

References

External links
Natural History Museum Lepidoptera generic names catalog

Labdia
Moths described in 1926